Gjovalin Gjadri (1899 - March 13, 1974) was an Albanian engineer, academic, and builder, born in Shkodër, then part of the Ottoman Empire. Among his works are the bridge on Dëshmorët e Kombit Boulevard in Tirana and the arch bridge of Mat (river), near Milot, Albania.

References

See also
Biographical sketch (in Albanian)
National Tourism Agency

1899 births
1974 deaths
Albanian engineers
People from Shkodër
20th-century engineers